Port Saint Louis can be:
 the original name of Puerto Soledad on the Falklands
 Port-Saint-Louis-du-Rhône, a commune in southern France